The 1947 Giro d'Italia was the 30th edition of the Giro d'Italia, one of cycling's Grand Tours. The field consisted of 84 riders, and 50 riders finished the race.

By rider

By nationality

References

1947 Giro d'Italia
1947